Fanner's Green is a hamlet and cul-de-sac road in the Great Waltham civil parish of the Chelmsford district of Essex, England.

References

Hamlets in Essex
Great Waltham